The Master and His Servants is a 1959 Norwegian drama film directed by Arne Skouen. The film is based on a 1955 play by Axel Kielland, who also plays a minor character in the film. The play and the film is based on true events in Sweden. The Master and his Servants was entered into the 9th Berlin International Film Festival.

Plot
Just after Sigurd Helmer (Claes Hill) is ordained a bishop, his archrival Tornkvist (Georg Løkkeberg) hands over a letter to the police claiming Helmer obtained his position through foul play. A power struggle between the two ensues which has serious implications for Helmer. The letter proves that Helmer has slandered his competitor Tornkvist in anonymous letters.

Tornkvist reveals his accusations at the inaugural dinner at the bishop's home. At the same time he announces his engagement to the bishop's daughter, Agnes (Anne-Lise Tangstad), who sides with him against her own father. Tornkvist and Agnes leave and the party breaks up in bewilderment. Helmer is left with his wife, who is torn between her love for her husband and her Christian faith. She wants him to accept responsibility like a true Christian. Eventually it emerges that Helmer's secretary had written the anonymous letters slandering Tornkvist. The secretary writes a confession and tries to commit suicide.

Cast
 Claes Gill - Sugurd Helmer, biskop
 Wenche Foss - Fru Helmer
 Georg Løkkeberg - Arvid Tornkvist, dr. theol
 Urda Arneberg - Frk. Monsen
 Lars Andreas Larssen - Leif Helmer
 Anne-Lise Tangstad - Agnes Helmer
 Sverre Hansen - Statsadvokaten
 Harald Heide Steen - Forsvareren
 Axel Kielland - Dommeren
 Einar Sissener - Politiebetsmann
 Egil Hjorth-Jenssen - Skrivemaskinreperatøren
 Helge Essmar - Legpredikanten
 Hans Coucheron-Aamot - Steen, biskop
 Carl Frederik Prytz - Prest
 Øyvind Øyen

References

External links

1959 films
1959 drama films
1950s Norwegian-language films
Norwegian black-and-white films
Films directed by Arne Skouen
Norwegian films based on plays
Norwegian drama films